In Greek mythology, Oxylus (Ancient Greek: Ὄξυλος Oxulos) may refer to:

 Oxylus, daimon of the mountain beech forests, son of Orius (god of Mount Othrys or the Pindus), who is noted in the Deipnosophistae for fathering the Hamadryads with his own sister Hamadryas.
 Oxylus, son for Ares and Protogeneia, daughter of Calydon.
 Oxylus, king of Elis; from Aetolia, son of Haemon (himself son of Thoas) or of Andraemon.

Notes

References 

 Apollodorus, The Library with an English Translation by Sir James George Frazer, F.B.A., F.R.S. in 2 Volumes, Cambridge, MA, Harvard University Press; London, William Heinemann Ltd. 1921. ISBN 0-674-99135-4. Online version at the Perseus Digital Library. Greek text available from the same website.
Athenaeus of Naucratis, The Deipnosophists or Banquet of the Learned. London. Henry G. Bohn, York Street, Covent Garden. 1854. Online version at the Perseus Digital Library.  Athenaeus of Naucratis, Deipnosophistae. Kaibel. In Aedibus B.G. Teubneri. Lipsiae. 1887. Greek text available at the Perseus Digital Library.

Mountain gods
Kings of Elis
Kings in Greek mythology
Children of Ares
Demigods in classical mythology
Aetolian characters in Greek mythology
Daimons